Freddie Williams may refer to:

Frederic Calland Williams (1911–1977), English engineer
Freddie Williams (speedway rider) (1926–2013), motorcycle speedway world champion
Freddie Williams II (born 1977), comics artist
Freddie Williams (businessman) (1942–2008), Scottish bookmaker
Freddie Williams (runner) (born 1962), Canadian track and field runner
Freddie Williams (Canadian football), football player

See also
Fred Williams (disambiguation)
Frederick Williams (disambiguation)